Heilongjiang University of Science and Technology  (USTH), founded in 1947, used to be a specialist school on mining technology. After developments in decades, it is now a multi-disciplinary university with its main disciplines engineering, management, social science, and natural science.

History

In 1947, a mining school was found in Jixi, which was the first mining school in northeast China.
In 1954, the school was incorporated with Hegang Mineralogy School, and named as Jixi Mineralogy School.
In 1958, Jixi Mineralogy College with Bachelor education was found based on Jixi Mineralogy School.
The college was renamed as Heilongjiang Institute of Mineralogy in 1981, and Heilongjiang Institute of Science and Technology in 2000.
In 2001, the institute starts a new campus in Harbin, and in 2003 the main campus moved from Jixi to Harbin.
In 2013, the institute was renamed as Heilongjiang University of Science and Technology.
In October 16, 2014, the Heilongjiang provincial people's Government and the State administration of work safety to build the Heilongjiang University of science and technology agreement signing ceremony was held in the University of science and technology in Heilongjiang.

Colleges and departments
 School of Mining Engineering
 School of Electrical Control Engineering
 School of Electrical Information Engineering
 School of Mechanical Engineering
 College of Environmental and Chemical Engineering
 School of Safety Engineering
 School of Material Science and Engineering]
 School of Civil Engineering
 School of Computer and Information Engineering
 School of Humanity and Social Science
 College of Science
 School of Management
 Economic College
 College of Foreign Languages

Partnerships
Heilongjiang University of Science and Technology has established international partnerships with universities and colleges from Russia and Canada. Particularly close partnerships are maintained with the following universities
 Far Eastern Federal University
 Northern Alberta Institute of Technology
 Douglas College

References

Universities and colleges in Harbin